Jim Monkmeyer is the President of Transportation at DHL Supply Chain. He was appointed in 2016.

Education 
Monkmeyer holds a Bachelor of Science degree in Civil and Environmental Engineering from the University of Wisconsin and a Master of Science in Transportation from The Transportation Center at Northwestern University.

References 

University of Wisconsin alumni
Northwestern University alumni
Living people
Place of birth missing (living people)
Year of birth missing (living people)